Denys Holaydo; Denis Golaydo (born 3 June 1984) is a retired Ukrainian-born Russian football midfielder.

Career
He debuted for the Ukraine national football team on Wednesday 26 March 2008, where he gave an assist to Ukrainian legend Andriy Shevchenko, helping Ukraine in the 2–0 win against Serbia. After the annexation of Crimea to the Russian Federation Golaydo also received a Russian passport.

External links
Player profile on Official Tavriya Profile 
Profile at FFU Official Website 

1984 births
Living people
Sportspeople from Simferopol
Ukrainian footballers
Association football midfielders
Ukrainian footballers banned from domestic competitions
SC Tavriya Simferopol players
FC Hoverla Uzhhorod players
FC Metalurh Donetsk players
Ukrainian Premier League players
Ukraine under-21 international footballers
Ukraine international footballers
Ukrainian expatriate footballers
Expatriate footballers in Belarus
Ukrainian expatriate sportspeople in Belarus
FC Slutsk players
Ukrainian emigrants to Russia
Naturalised citizens of Russia
Russian footballers
FC TSK Simferopol players
Crimean Premier League players